Baniwa may refer to:
 Baniwa language, several languages of the Amazon with the name
 Baniwa people, an ethnic group of the Amazon
 Baniwa (moth), a genus of moths

See also 
 Banawa (disambiguation)